The Pacifier is a 2005 American family action comedy film directed by Adam Shankman, written by Thomas Lennon and Robert Ben Garant and stars Vin Diesel. 
After a failed rescue mission, Navy SEAL Shane Wolfe is assigned as babysitter to the dead man's family.

The film was released in March 4, 2005 by Walt Disney Pictures. It received generally negative reviews from critics. It grossed $113 million in the United States and a total of $198 million worldwide against a budget of $56 million.

Plot

U.S. Navy SEAL lieutenant Shane Wolfe is assigned to rescue Howard Plummer, a man working on a top-secret government project, from a group of Serbian rebels. Shane and his team successfully get Plummer off an enemy boat. Boarding the helicopter to escape, the team is attacked and Plummer is killed. Shane spends two months in the hospital recovering from gunshot wounds to the chest.

At the United States Naval Academy in Annapolis, Maryland, Shane's commanding officer, Captain Bill Fawcett, explains that he has been assigned to escort Plummer's widow, Julie, to Zürich, to retrieve the contents of Plummer's safety deposit box. Meanwhile, Shane has been assigned to stay at the Plummer residence in Bethesda, Maryland, to search for the secret project called GHOST and mind the family's five children: Zoe, Seth, Lulu, Peter, and baby Tyler. The kids prove to be difficult to handle, even with the help of nanny Helga, who quits when one of Zoe and Seth's pranks intended for Shane goes wrong. Shane eventually begins to discover the children's problems and resolve them, gaining their trust after saving them from a pair of armed ninjas.

Later, the school's vice principal, Duane Murney, informs Shane that Seth has cut and bleached his hair, has a Nazi armband in his locker, and has skipped a month of wrestling practices. At home, Seth tells Shane he only joined the wrestling team because of his father. After Seth sneaks out of the house, Shane follows and learns that Seth has secretly joined an amateur production of The Sound of Music, playing the role of Rolf. The director quits, and Shane takes charge of the show, takes care of the house, gives Zoe driving lessons, and teaches Lulu and her fellow Firefly Scouts martial arts to defend themselves against rival scouts.

As Seth quits the wrestling team, Shane challenges Murney to a wrestling match in front of the entire school, which he easily wins despite Murney's show of bluster. The Firefly Girl Scouts use the skill Shane taught them to fight and tie up the rival boy scouts. Zoe and Shane share stories of their fathers, both of whom died in similar circumstances, and both hug. They are interrupted by a phone call from Julie, who has figured out the password "My Angel", retrieved a two-prong key from the box, and is on her way home. The kids immediately plan a "Welcome Home" party.

That evening, Shane discovers a secret vault underneath the garage, which requires the key Julie just acquired. When Bill and Julie arrive home, he and Shane go to the garage, where Shane says he is rethinking his career. The two ninjas from before arrive and pull off their masks, revealing themselves as the Chuns—the Plummers' North Korean next-door neighbors. Suddenly, Bill overpowers Shane and knocks him out, revealing himself to be a double agent. Mr. Chun secures the children while Bill and Mrs. Chun take Julie down to the vault. They open the door, but a dangerous security system prevents them from proceeding.

The children elude Mr. Chun and wake Shane, who sends them to get help while he goes to the vault to help Julie. Mr. Chun follows them in Bill's car. With Zoe at the wheel, the kids force him to crash. Shane gets past the security system using the dance Howard had used to lull Peter to sleep each night. Julie knocks out Mrs. Chun, and Shane's voice activates the final vault, opening the door which knocks Bill unconscious. By then, the children have lured a large crowd of police to the house. Mr. Chun arrives and holds all of them at gunpoint. Shane notices the school principal and his love interest Claire Fletcher (who also happens to be a fellow retired Navy officer) right behind him, having followed the chase when she saw it pass by the school. Shane distracts Mr. Chun with the help of the family pet duck Gary, and Claire knocks him unconscious.

Bill and the Chuns are arrested, and Shane and the Plummers say their goodbyes. At Seth's performance, it is revealed that Shane has retired from the Navy and joined the school staff as the new wrestling coach. Murney, dressed as a nun, also performs in the play, singing "Climb Ev'ry Mountain" off-key, and Claire and Shane kiss backstage.

Cast

Soundtrack

Reception

Box office
Entertainment Weekly predicted that the film would earn about $17 million and come in second behind John Travolta's Be Cool. It opened at #1 in the box office upon its opening weekend with $30.6 million. By the end of its run, it earned $198.6 million worldwide.

Critical response
On Rotten Tomatoes, the film has a 21% approval rating based on 130 reviews, with an average rating of 3.80/10. The site's critical consensus reads, "Vin Diesel parodies his tough guy image for the family audience, but the result is only moderately amusing." On Metacritic, the film has a weighted average score of 30 out of 100, based on 27 critics, indicating "generally unfavorable reviews". Audiences polled by CinemaScore gave the film an average grade of "A−" on an A+ to F scale.

Roger Ebert gave the film two stars out of four, writing, "This premise is promising, but somehow the movie never really takes off."

Todd McCarthy of Variety wrote: "If [audiences] swallow this odoriferous exercise in calculated career repositioning, they'll swallow anything."

Possible sequel

In December 2015, Vin Diesel said that a sequel was being written.

References

External links

 
 
 

2005 action comedy films
2005 comedy films
2005 films
American action comedy films
2000s English-language films
Films about babies
Films about children
Films about families
Films about siblings
Films about the Serbian Mafia
Films about widowhood
Films directed by Adam Shankman
Films produced by Roger Birnbaum
Films scored by John Debney
Films set in Montgomery County, Maryland
Films shot in Toronto
Scouting in popular culture
Spyglass Entertainment films
Walt Disney Pictures films
2000s American films